Success was a 38-gun fourth rate vessel captured from the French by the Commonwealth of England, She was captured on 19 October 1650 as the 38-gun Jules. She was commissioned into the Parliamentary Naval Force as Success. During the First Anglo-Dutch War she partook in the Battle of Portland and the Battle of Porto Farina. She spent time in the Mediterranean and escorting convoys. She was sold on 3 September 1662.

Success was the first named vessel in the English or Royal Navy.

Specifications
She was built in Stockholm in 1647 as the Julius then gifted to France in 1648 as the Jules. She was captured by Phoenix on 19 October 1650 off the Portuguese coast. Her builder's measure tonnage was calculated as  tons. Her gun armament in 1650 was 38 guns and it was decreased to 34 wartime and 30 peacetime. Her manning was 150 personnel and later to 140/110/80 personnel.

Commissioned Service

Service in the English Civil War and Commonwealth Navy
She was commissioned into the Parliamentary Navy in 1651 under the command of Captain Butler Noades until he was killed in 1652. Later in 1652 she was under Captain William Kendall.

First Anglo-Dutch War
During the First Anglo-Dutch War she partook in the Battle of Portland on 18 February 1653. As a member of Blue Squadron, Center Division she took part in the Battle of the Gabbard on 2–3 June 1653.

She then sailed with Robert Blake's Fleet to the Mediterranean in August 1654. She partook in the Battle of Porto Farina in Tunisia on 4 April 1655. She was under Captain Zachary Brown in to 1657. In 1658 she was under Captain Thomas Fleet, She escorted a convoy of East India ships to Helena, returning with the home bound convoy in 1660. She was laid in ordinary on her return.

Disposition
Success was reported as not worth repairing on 15 April 1662 and sold on 3 September 1662.

Notes

Citations

References

 British Warships in the Age of Sail (1603 – 1714), by Rif Winfield, published by Seaforth Publishing, England © Rif Winfield 2009, EPUB ISBN 978-1-78346-924-6:
 Fleet Actions, 1.5 Battle off Portland
 Fleet Actions, 1.7 Battle of the Gabbard
 Fleet Actions, 2.1 Battle of Porto Farina
 Chapter 4 Fourth Rates - 'Small Ships', Vessels acquired from 25 March 1603, Ex-French Prizes (1650-52), Success
 Ships of the Royal Navy, by J.J. Colledge, revised and updated by Lt-Cdr Ben Warlow and Steve Bush, published by Seaforth Publishing, Barnsley, Great Britain, © the estate of J.J. Colledge, Ben Warlow and Steve Bush 2020, EPUB , Section S (Success)
 The Arming and Fitting of English Ships of War 1600 - 1815, by Brian Lavery, published by US Naval Institute Press © Brian Lavery 1989, Part V Guns, Type of Guns

Ships of the line of the Royal Navy
1600s ships
Ships of the English navy